Russell Eugene Washington (December 17, 1946 – August 5, 2021) was an American professional football player who was an offensive and defensive lineman for the San Diego Chargers of the American Football League (AFL) and National Football League (NFL) from 1968 to 1982. He was taken in the first round (4th overall) of the 1968 Common AFL/NFL Draft out of the University of Missouri.

Accolades
Washington was selected 2nd Team All-Pro twice in his career, 1979 and 1982, 1st Team All-AFC in 1974 and 1978 and 2nd Team All-AFC in 1973 and 1977. He was selected to the Pro Bowl on five occasions 1974–75 and 1977–79 and won the Forrest Gregg Award as the NFL Offensive Lineman of the Year for 1977.

Washington was inducted into the Chargers Hall of Fame in 1995 and the Greater Kansas City Football Coaches Association Hall of Fame in 2016.

Personal life
He later owned a car wash in National City of San Diego, California.

See also
Other American Football League players

References

External links
Profile on NFL.com

 

1946 births
2021 deaths
American football offensive linemen
Missouri Tigers football players
Players of American football from Kansas City, Missouri
San Diego Chargers players
American Conference Pro Bowl players
University of Missouri alumni
Tampa Bay Bandits players
American Football League players